Aerodynamics is the science of the motion of air.

Aerodynamic may also refer to:
 "Aerodynamic" (instrumental), a 2001 instrumental by Daft Punk
 Aerodynamic center
 Aerodynamics Inc., an American charter airline
 Aerodynamics Research Institute

See also
 Aerobraking
 Automotive aerodynamics